Second Spanish Album was an LP album featuring The Sandpipers released in 1970 in the United Kingdom (A&M AMLS 969).  Other international releases included Australia (A&M AML-33753), Germany (A&M 2320 008), Mexico (A&M AML/S 1045), New Zealand (A&M SAML-933753), and Venezuela (A&M AMC 2134).  It was re-released in 1973 in Australia (World Record Club S-5395, different cover).  The album was not released in the U.S. or Canada.

Except for "Born Free", the tracks were all songs that had previously been released on the earlier Sandpipers albums Softly and The Wonder of You. However, some of the tracks are shortened and others extended. Most of the Spanish vocals were redone for this album.

Track listing
Let Go (Porque Te Vas?) (Norman Gimbel/Baden Powell) [all-Spanish vocals; shortened version as compared to English version]
Wave (Sencacional) (Antonio Carlos Jobim) [all-Spanish vocals]
All My Loving (Con Todo Mi Amor) (Lennon–McCartney) [all-Spanish vocals; longer than English version]
Love Is Blue (El Amor Es Triste) (André Popp/Pierre Cour/Brian Blackburn)
To Put Up With You (Yo Ya Me Voy)  (Roger Nichols/Paul Williams) [all-Spanish vocals]
That Night (Amor Fugaz) (Norman Gimbel/Lalo Schifrin) [all-Spanish vocals]
Born Free (Libre) (John Barry/Don Black)
Pretty Flamingo (Como Un Flamingo) (Mark Barkan) [all-Spanish vocals]
Yellow Days (La Mentira) (Alan Bernstein/Álvaro Carrillo) [all-Spanish vocals]
The More I Love You (Lo Mucho Que Te Quiero) (René Herrera/Sammy Ibarra/René Ornelas) [all-Spanish vocals]
A Man Without Love (Quando M'Innamoro) Cuando Me Enamoro (Roberto Livraghi/Barry Mason/Duranice Pace/Marissa Panzeri) [all-Spanish vocals; longer than original Italian version]

Production
Producers: Tommy LiPuma, Chuck Anderson
Arrangers: Nick DeCaro, Mort Garson, Bob Thompson
Engineer: Ray Gerhardt
Art Director: Tom Wilkes
Photography - Front Cover: Tom Wilkes
Photography - Back Cover: Jim McCrary
Sleeve Notes: Chuck Anderson
Spanish lyrics: Rosendo Montiel & Chuck Anderson

References

The Sandpipers albums
1970 compilation albums
Spanish-language compilation albums
A&M Records compilation albums
Albums produced by Tommy LiPuma